Abdul Sattar Abdul Nabi is an Indian politician from Maharashtra. He was briefly a minister in 2014 in the Congress government in Maharashtra. In 2019 he left Congress and joined Shiv Sena. He is a three term Member of the Maharashtra Legislative Assembly from the Sillod constituency. He served as the state's Cabinet Minister for Animal Husbandry.

Political career

Early career 
In 1984, Sattar successfully contested the Grampanchayat elections. He entered Taluka politics in 1994–95, becoming the Mayor (Nagaradhyaksha) of Sillod city on 5 March 1994. He approached Congress in 1999 to become a candidate for the Legislative Assembly elections, but was unsuccessful. He stood as an independent and finished second.

He was elected as the Vidhanparishad MLA of Sillod in 2001. After his term ended as MLA, Abdul Sattar contested the legislative assembly elections of 2004, losing by 301 votes.  	

He was elected as the MLA for the Sillod constituency from the Aurangabad district in 2009, winning by a margin of 30,000 votes with the help of local political leader Prabhakarr Palodkar, who had recently rejoined the Congress party after 12 years.

In 2014, he won a second term in the legislative assembly, and was appointed a cabinet minister with the animal husbandry, fisheries and dairy development portfolio. In 2016, he petitioned for banning alcohol sales in the state of Maharashtra.

On 22 March 2017, Sattar was suspended until 31 December, along with 18 other MLAs, for interrupting Maharashtra Finance Minister Sudhir Mungantiwar during a state budget session and burning copies of the budget outside the assembly four days earlier. On 15 June 2017, a case was filed against Sattar and 29 others for rioting and assaulting a farmer.

Resignation from Congress Party and joining Shiv Sena 
On 19 December 2016, Sattar resigned as the leader of the Congress Party in Aurangabad district, claiming that the party had not cooperated with him during the 2016 local elections.

On 30 July 2018, Sattar resigned from the Assembly in support of the Maratha quota demand, which would guarantee government jobs and education to be reserved for Marathas.

In March 2019, Sattar was expecting to become the Congress Party candidate for the Aurangabad Lok Sabha constituency for the 2019 Indian general election. On being denied a ticket, which instead went to Subhash Zambad, Sattar resigned from the party. Sattar also removed 300 chairs from the local party office, claiming they belonged to him. Congress party officially expelled Sattar on 20 April 2019 for anti-party activities. In late March 2019, Sattar announced he would join the ruling Bharatiya Janta Party (BJP), but this move was opposed by the local BJP leadership, later Sattar backtracked by saying that his meeting with the Devendra Fadnavis (BJP chief minister) was apolitical. In late June 2019, Sattar met Shiv Sena chief Uddhav Thackeray, fueling speculation that he may join the party.

Sattar officially joined the Shiv Sena party on 2 September 2019 in presence of Shiv Sena chief Uddhav Thackeray.

Positions held 

 2009: Elected to Maharashtra Legislative Assembly
 2014: Re-Elected to Maharashtra Legislative Assembly
 2019: Re-Elected to Maharashtra Legislative Assembly
 2019: Appointed minister of state for Revenue, Rural Development, Ports, Khar land Development and Special Assistance
 2020: Appointed guardian minister of Dhule district

See also
 Uddhav Thackeray ministry

References

External links
 Abdul Sattar Official Website

Living people
Maharashtra MLAs 2014–2019
Indian Muslims
1965 births
Marathi people
Maharashtra district councillors
People from Aurangabad district, Maharashtra